Benjamin Blythe Homestead, also known as Hazel Glen and Blythstead, is a historic home located at Shippensburg in Cumberland County, Pennsylvania, United States. It was built before 1798, and is a two-story, limestone house in the Georgian style, with a rear kitchen ell. Benjamin Blythe was one of the first 15 settlers of the Shippensburg area.

It was listed on the National Register of Historic Places in 1977.

References 

Georgian architecture in Pennsylvania
Houses completed in 1798
Houses in Cumberland County, Pennsylvania
Houses on the National Register of Historic Places in Pennsylvania
National Register of Historic Places in Cumberland County, Pennsylvania